

Antique vessels
Monza ampullae, 6th century, metal souvenirs of pilgrimages to the Holy Land.
Holy Ampulla, glass, part of the French coronation regalia and believed to have divine origins.
The Ampulla in the British Crown Jewels, a hollow, gold, eagle-shaped vessel from which the anointing oil is poured at the Coronation of the British Monarch.

Medicine and science
Any of several anatomical structures:
Ampullae of Lorenzini, electroreceptors in fish
Ampulla of semicircular canal (osseous ampulla), dilated portion at the end of the semicircular canals in the inner ear) within which the ampullar cristae and cupula can be found
Ampulla of uterine tube (ampulla tubae uterinae)
Ampulla of vas deferens or ampulla of ductus deferens (ampulla vas deferentis or ampulla ductus deferentis)
Cisterna chyli (ampulla chyli), dilated sac at the lower end of the thoracic duct
Duodenal ampulla or duodenal cap (ampulla duodeni), the very first part of the duodenum, which is not retroperitoneal
Hepatopancreatic ampulla, also called ampulla of Vater
Rectal ampulla (ampulla recti)
 Ampullae, bulb-like structures above the tube feet in echinoderms, and part of the valvae in arthropod male genitals
Ampulla (gastropod), a genus of sea snails